Asian Americans in San Francisco can refer to:

 History of Chinese Americans in San Francisco
 History of Japanese Americans in San Francisco
 Indian-Americans in the San Francisco Bay Area